Jowita Budnik (née Miondlikowska; born 28 November 1973) is a Polish actress. 

Budnik was born in Warsaw and studied at the University of Warsaw.

She made her film debut in 1985 at the age of 11 in Radosław Piwowarski's Kochankowie mojej mamy ("My Mom's Lovers"). She has appeared in such films as Papusza, Plac Zbawiciela and  Jeziorak as well as the television series M jak miłość and W labiryncie. In 2017, she received Best Actress Award at the Chicago International Film Festival for her role in film Birds Are Singing in Kigali.

References

External links
 

1973 births
Living people
Polish film actresses
Polish television actresses